John Palmer House is a historic house in Portland, Oregon, United States.  It is listed on the National Register of Historic Places.

John Palmer was a builder who settled in Portland, Oregon in the 19th century.  Construction on the John Palmer House was started in 1890.  John Palmer's wife died just four years after moving into the home.  For many years the home was used as the Multnomah Conservatory of Music.  The Sauter Family purchased the John Palmer House in the late 1960s and lavished great care and attention on the home.  They opened the home as a bed and breakfast and hosted many receptions and weddings in the beautiful garden.  Maggie Kolkena and Susan Dunn purchased the home in 2008 for use by not-for-profit organizations. Refreshing this grand old house has included complete re-wiring and re-plumbing, the remodel of the kitchen and addition of a modern bathroom.  The main floor, with its extravagant Bradbury & Bradbury wallpapers, remains largely unchanged.  External work was initiated in the spring of 2010.  The house has a new roof, a repaired porch and a new coat of paint.

See also
National Register of Historic Places listings in North Portland, Oregon

References

External links
 
 Property info from Portlandmaps.com

1890 establishments in Oregon
Houses on the National Register of Historic Places in Portland, Oregon
Humboldt, Portland, Oregon
Houses completed in 1890
North Portland, Oregon
Portland Historic Landmarks